Sand Ridge or Sandridge may refer to:

Places

In Australia

 Electoral district of Sandridge, Victoria
 Port Melbourne, Victoria, historically known as Sandridge

In the United Kingdom

 Sandridge, Hertfordshire, a village and civil parish
 Sandridge, Stoke Gabriel, Devon
 Sandridge, Wiltshire

In the United States

 Sand Ridge neighborhood, Southwest community, Birmingham, Alabama 
 Sand Ridge Township, Jackson County, Illinois
 Sand Ridge State Forest, Mason County, Illinois 
 Sand Ridge, Indiana, an unincorporated community
 Sand Ridge, New York, a hamlet and census-designated place
 Sand Ridge, Houston County, Texas, an unincorporated community
 Sand Ridge, Wharton County, Texas, an unincorporated community
 Sand Ridge, West Virginia, an unincorporated community
 Sand Ridge, a Tulare Lake sandspit that once formed a chain of islands in California.

Other uses
 Sand Ridge Golf Club, Geauga County, Ohio, United States
 SandRidge Energy, an oil and natural gas exploration company headquartered in Oklahoma City, Oklahoma, United States
 Sandridge Bridge, Melbourne, Victoria, Australia
 Sandridge Trail, a bicycle and pedestrian path in Port Melbourne, Victoria, Australia
 Shane Sandridge, a politician in Colorado

See also
 Sandridge No. 8 Precinct, Menard County, Illinois, United States
 Clough Creek and Sand Ridge Archeological District, near Cincinnati, Ohio, United States
 Sand Hill (disambiguation)